Robert William Blunt (born 4 March 1951) is a rock guitarist who has worked with a variety of bands, most notably with Robert Plant's solo band in the 1980s. Since leaving Plant's band in the mid 1980s, Blunt has provided session work for a number of artists such as Julian Lennon, Tom Petty and the Heartbreakers, and Clannad. He was member of the band Bronco in the early 1970s.

Select discography

Albums
Bronco
1970: Country Home
1971: Ace of Sunlight
Silverhead
1973: 16 and Savaged
Broken Glass
1975: Broken Glass
Stan Webb's Chicken Shack
1977: The Creeper
1978: That's the Way We Are
Robert Plant
1982: Pictures at Eleven
1983: The Principle of Moments
1985: Shaken 'n' Stirred
Edie Brickell & New Bohemians
1988: Shooting Rubberbands at the Stars
Jeff Healey
1988: See the Light
John Kilzer
1991: Busman's Holiday

References

External links

English rock guitarists
English male guitarists
Living people
Musicians from Worcestershire
English session musicians
Chicken Shack members
The Honeydrippers members
1951 births